Paschal is a surname and given name.

Paschal may also refer to:

 of or pertaining to Easter
 of or pertaining to the Passover
 R. L. Paschal High School in Fort Worth, Texas, U.S.
 Paschal's, an American foodservice company

See also

 Pascal (given name)
 Pascal (surname)
 Pascal (disambiguation)
 Pascha (disambiguation)
 Paschal Lamb (disambiguation)
 Paschall (disambiguation)
 Pascual (disambiguation)
 Paskal (disambiguation)
 Pasqual (disambiguation)
 Pasquale (disambiguation)
 Paschal candle, used liturgies in Western Christianity 
 Paschal cycle, the cycle of moveable feasts around Pascha in the Eastern Orthodox Church
 Paschal greeting, an Easter custom 
 Paschal Homily, sermon read aloud on the morning of Pascha (Easter)
 Paschal mystery, one of the central concepts of Catholic faith 
 Paschal Triduum, three day period to Easter Sunday
 Paschal trikirion, liturgical triple-candlestick 
 Paschal troparion, hymn for the celebration of Pascha (Easter) 
 Paschal full moon,  the Ecclesiastical full moon used in the determination of the date of Easter
 Paska (bread), Easter bread
 Paskha, an Easter dish